Carlos Orellana Martínez (28 December 1900 in Hidalgo – 24 January 1960 in Mexico City) was a Mexican actor, film director and screenwriter.

Filmography

As actor 

1932: Santa - Hipólito
1933: El anónimo - Médico
1933: La llorona - Mario - criado
1933: La noche del pecado
1934: Juárez y Maximiliano - Doctor Basch
1937: No te engañes corazón - Don Boni(facio) Bonafé
1937: La Paloma - Coronel Refugio Romero
1937: No basta ser madre
1938: Sucedió en La Habana
1938: El Rosario de Amozoc - Odilón
1938: El romance del palmar
1939: El capitán aventurero - Sgt. Carrasquilla
1939: El hotel de los chiflados - Administrador
1939: En un burro tres baturros - Santiago Míguez
1939: Calumnia - Dr. Pietro
1939: Mujeres y toros
1939: El signo de la muerte - Dr. Gallardo
1940: Pobre diablo - Ponciano Luque
1940: La canción del milagro - Isaac
1940: Miente y serás feliz - Don Juan
1940: Borrasca humana
1940: El secreto de la monja - Don Diego de Carbajal
1941: Noche de recién casados
1941: Cinco minutos de amor - Don Ataulfo
1942: Dos mexicanos en Sevilla
1942: Simón Bolívar - General José Antonio Páez
1942: The Eternal Secret - Don Justo
1943: Qué hombre tan simpático - Don Pancho
1943: Tierra de pasiones - Salvador Peredo
1943: Arriba las mujeres - Laureano
1944: El herrero
1944: El pecado de una madre - Sargento Pedro Perdiguero
1944: The Escape - Neftali
1944: El intruso - La Valle
1944: Alma de bronce
1945: Amor prohibido - Don Pepe
1945: La hora de la verdad
1945: Escuadrón 201 - Don Matías
1945: La Casa de la zorra - Ancona
1946: Pepita Jiménez - Padre Belisario
1946: Crimen en la alcoba - Don Trinidad Rojas
1947: The Golden Boat - Tío Laureano
1947: Los tres García - Señor cura
1947: ¡Vuelven los García! - Señor cura
1948: Enrédate y verás - Farid
1949: Café de chinos - Señor Chang Chong
1950: Cuando los hijos odian - Tachito
1950: Anacleto se divorcia - Anacleto
1951: ¡... Y murió por nosotros! - Don Camilo, presidente municipal
1951: Acá las tortas - Don Chente Mendoza
1952: Un Príncipe de la iglesia
1952: Cuando los hijos pecan
1953: Del rancho a la televisión - Don Cecilio Zárraga
1953: Dos tipos de cuidado - Don Elías
1953: Reportaje - Policeman
1954: Romance de fieras - Don Carlos Narváez
1954: Borrasca en las almas - Tío Bartolomé
1954: La Calle de los amores - Tío Alejo
1954: Maldita ciudad - Lucas
1955: Los Paquetes de Paquita - Orlando
1955: Cupido pierde a Paquita - don Severo
1955: Tú y las nubes
1956: Las medias de seda - Pretonio
1957: Tizoc: Amor Indio - Don Pancho García
1958: El Castillo de los monstruos - Don Melchor
1958: Bajo el cielo de México - Don Chavita, cobrador de taxes
1959: Dos corazones y un cielo - Don Atanasio Turrubiates (final film role)

As director 
1941: Noche de recién casados
1942: Dos mexicanos en Sevilla
1942: El que tenga un amor
1942: The Eternal Secret
1943: ¡Arriba las mujeres!
1945: El Capitán Malacara
1945: Como México no hay dos!
1946: Cásate y verás
1946: Madman and Vagabond
1948: Enrédate y verás
1948: La casa de la Troya
1948: Flor de caña
1948: Mi esposa busca novio
1949: Cara sucia
1958: El gran premio
1960: Un trío de tres

External links
 .

Mexican male film actors
Mexican film directors
1900 births
1960 deaths
20th-century Mexican male actors
Male actors from Hidalgo (state)
20th-century Mexican screenwriters
20th-century Mexican male writers